Robert Harris (28 March 1900 – 18 May 1995) was a British actor. He graduated from Royal Academy of Dramatic Art in 1925, and his stage work included seasons at Stratford, the Old Vic, and on Broadway as Marchbanks in Bernard Shaw's Candida in 1937, opposite Katharine Cornell; He also appeared in more than sixty films from 1930 to 1982.

He was the castaway on Desert Island Discs on 10 February 1955.

Filmography

References

External links 

1900 births
1995 deaths
British male stage actors
British male film actors
People from Weston-super-Mare
Alumni of RADA